Pico do Jabre is the highest mountain in the Brazilian state of Paraíba, at . It is located in the municipality of Maturéia.

The mountain is protected by the  Pico do Jabre State Park, created in 1992.

References 

Mountains of Brazil
Landforms of Paraíba
Highest points of Brazilian states